The Main Art Theater was a movie theater located at 118 North Main Street in downtown Royal Oak, Michigan, at the corner of Main Street and 11 Mile Road. Opened on August 7, 1941 by Robert Anthony, the theater was originally a single-screen theater with 800 seats. In 1983, the original 800-seat theater was split into two theaters during renovations, and a third theater was added to the building in 1993.

The Main Art specialized in art films and independent movies, and regularly held midnight showings of classic films on Friday and Saturday nights. The theater showed mainstream films prior to its arthouse renovation in 1983.

Landmark Theatres operated the Main Art from 1997 until its closure in 2021. In May 2022, A.F. Jonna Management & Development gained approval from the Royal Oak City Council to demolish the theater for a mixed-use building. The Main Art was officially demolished on the afternoon of July 25, 2022.

History
The Main Art Theater was first opened in 1941 by Robert Anthony as a single-screen, 800-seat theater that specialized in mainstream films. In 1983, renovations and changes were done, which included the original single-screen theater being split in two to make two separate theaters. This was when the Main Art began to show art films and independent films. The Main Art was again renovated in 1993 to add a third theater. In 1997, Landmark Theatres took over the Main Art and operated it until its closure. In summer 1999, the Main Art was one of only 15 theaters in North America showing The Blair Witch Project, and every show on the schedule was sold out with people coming from as far away as Indiana and upstate New York to see the movie. The Main Art also specialized in midnight showings of classic films from the early 20th century to present day such as North by Northwest, The Goonies, and Ghost in the Shell, along with cult films like Tommy Wiseau's The Room.

Due to the COVID-19 pandemic, the Main Art temporarily closed its doors in March 2020 before reopening on Christmas Day later that year. In April 2021, the Main Art closed temporarily once again due to financial constraints. On June 12, 2021, the Main Art closed down permanently when Landmark Theatres ended their lease of the building and returned the property to A.F. Jonna Management & Development. Immediately after its closure, a nonprofit group called Friends of Main Art Theater formed with the intention of preserving the historic building; the group's goal, according to the site description, "is to foster and develop public appreciation of independent film and the arts, and to preserve the Royal Oak Main Art building as a movie theater for the enjoyment of the greater Metro Detroit community."

In May 2022, the Royal Oak City Council voted to allow A.F. Jonna Management & Development to demolish the Main Art Theater and construct a mixed-use apartment complex on the theater site. The Main Art was officially demolished on the afternoon of July 25, 2022.

Photo gallery

See also

References

Royal Oak, Michigan
Metro Detroit
Cinemas and movie theaters